Melino is a rural locality (a village) in Chuchkovskoye Rural Settlement, Sokolsky District, Vologda Oblast, Russia. The population was 4 as of 2002.

Geography 
Melino is located 91 km northeast of Sokol (the district's administrative centre) by road. Pogrebnoye is the nearest rural locality.

Name origin 
Melino is also a name. The name, Melino originated from East Asia and South Europe. The name, Melino also originated from the greek name Melanis

References 

Rural localities in Sokolsky District, Vologda Oblast